Area codes 706 and 762 are telephone area codes in the North American Numbering Plan (NANP) for the northern and west central parts of Georgia, but excluding metropolitan Atlanta.

The numbering plan area (NPA) is divided into three disconnected geographical regions. A small section is in west-central Georgia, in the region around Columbus. This is bordered by area code 334 to the west in Alabama, area code 478 to the east, area code 229 to the south, and metro Atlanta's 404, 678, 770, and 470. It does not border the landline area of 404, only the cellphone area. Additionally, the Yatesville rate center is in area codes 706 and 762, but not adjacent to any other rate centers in 706/762. The Yatesville rate center shares a small border with 770 to the north, but is almost surrounded by 478 to the south, east, and west.

The major section of 706 wraps around from Rome in northwest Georgia, east through the mountains past Dahlonega, meeting its narrowest point at Toccoa, then broadening south to Athens and Augusta. It touches Alabama's area code 256/938 and 334 on the far west, Tennessee's area code 423 on the northwest, North Carolina's area code 828 and Upstate South Carolina's area code 864 to the north-northeast, and midlands area codes 803 and 839 to the east, and middle Georgia's 478 and metro Atlanta as above.

History
When the North American Numbering Plan was created in 1947, the entire state of Georgia was assigned area code 404. On July 1, 1954, the southern portion of the state, from Macon southward, was split off with area code 912. Area code 404 was limited to the northern half of the state, from the Tennessee and North Carolina state lines as far south as Columbus and Augusta. This configuration remained in place for 38 years.

In 1992, almost all of the old 404 territory outside the Atlanta area was split off as area code 706. Originally, 706 consisted of a horseshoe-shaped region that completely wrapped around the inner ring of Atlanta. It also included a number of southern exurbs of Atlanta.  However, the residents of these areas felt chagrin at no longer being associated with 404.  Shortly after 706 commenced service, BellSouth returned several of these areas to 404. The boundary was redrawn in such a way that isolated Columbus and the surrounding area from the rest of the 706 territory, making 706 one of the few area codes that is not contiguous. 

BellSouth and the Georgia Public Service Commission knew that due to Atlanta's explosive growth, 404 was still on the brink of exhaustion even after the creation of 706. They had already planned to introduce 770 as the area code for Atlanta's suburban ring later in the 1990s. However, the return of the southern exurbs forced the GPSC to put 770 into service in 1995, a few years sooner than planned.

In June 2005, the GPSC announced that 706 had nearly exhausted its capacity for new telephone exchange prefixes. On June 24, 2005, the NANPA assigned area code 762 for this purpose. However, the Columbus area was not large enough for its own area code, but was too large to stay in 706. For this reason, it was decided to make 762 an overlay, with permissive dialing allowed on September 3. On April 1, 2007, ten-digit dialing became mandatory in the 706/762 territory.

Despite the rapid growth in 706/762's main section (particularly the northern portion), it is nowhere near exhausting.  Under current projections, it is expected to remain in its unusual, non-contiguous state until after 2049. 

Prior to 1990, area code 706 was used for dialing parts of the Baja California areas of Mexico from the United States.

Service area
The 706/762 overlay serves the following counties:
Banks, Burke (part with area code 478), Chattooga, Catoosa, Chattahoochee, Clarke, Columbia, Dade, Dawson, Elbert, Fannin, Franklin, Floyd, Gilmer, Glascock, Gordon, Greene, Habersham, Hancock, Harris, Hart, Heard, Jackson, Jasper, Jefferson (part with area code 478), Jenkins, Lincoln, Lumpkin, Madison, McDuffie, Meriwether, Morgan, Murray, Muscogee, Oconee, Oglethorpe, Putnam, Rabun, Richmond, Stephens, Talbot, Taliaferro, Towns, Troup, Union, Upson (part with area code 478), Walker, Warren, White, Whitfield, and Wilkes

See also
List of NANP area codes
North American Numbering Plan

References

External links

 List of exchanges from AreaCodeDownload.com, 706 Area Code
 List of exchanges from AreaCodeDownload.com, 762 Area Code

Area codes in the United States
Area codes in Georgia (U.S. state)